Euan James McIntyre (born 16 December 1951) is a Scottish former cricketer and administrator.

McIntyre was born at Edinburgh in December 1951 and was educated in the city at George Heriot's School. A club cricketer for Heriot's Cricket Club, McIntyre made his debut for Scotland in first-class cricket against Ireland at Dublin in 1981. He made a second first-class appearance against Ireland in 1983 at Downpatrick. Four years after his second appearance, McIntyre made his debut in List A one-day cricket when Scotland played Kent at Myreside in the 1987 NatWest Trophy. He made a further four one-day appearances the following season, making three appearances in the Benson & Hedges Cup and one in the NatWest Trophy. He took 3 wickets in these matches, at an expensive average of exactly 64. After working in accountancy, McIntyre was appointed operations director for Cricket Scotland in 2003, a position he held until his retirement in 2013. During his tenure, he oversaw the introduction of professionalism into the Scottish cricket set-up.

References

External links
 

1951 births
Living people
Cricketers from Edinburgh
People educated at George Heriot's School
Scottish accountants
Scottish cricketers
Scottish cricket administrators